Clancy in Wall Street is a 1930 American pre-Code comedy film. It stars Charles Murray, who had made a number of films for Edward Small.

It was also known as Clancy Caught Short and was described as the first comedy about the stock market crash. It was the last film for director Ted Wilde, who had died in December of the previous year.

Plot
Plumber Michael Clancy, fixing up some pipe on the stock exchange, accidentally buys some stock and makes a quick $200 on a 20 percent margin. He wants to continue but his partner, Andy MacIntosh, refuses to get involved. Clancy makes a fortune, leaves his business, and crashes high society, ignoring his old friend, and urging his daughter, Katie, to reject MacIntosh's son in favor of Freddie Saunders. Then the stock market crashes.

Cast
Charles Murray as Michael Clancy 
Aggie Herring as Mrs. Clancy
Lucien Littlefield as Andy MacIntosh 
Edward Nugent as Donald MacIntosh 
Miriam Seegar as Katie Clancy 
Reed Howes as Freddie Saunders

References

External links
Clancy in Wall Street, imdb.com

1930 films
1930 comedy films
American black-and-white films
American comedy films
1930s English-language films
Films directed by Ted Wilde
Films produced by Edward Small
1930s American films